Phyllonorycter quinqueguttella is a moth of the family Gracillariidae. It is found from Fennoscandia to the Pyrenees, Alps, Hungary and Ukraine and from Ireland to central Russia.

The wingspan is 6-7.5 mm.  The forewings are golden ochreous; a white median streak from base to near middle, dark -margined above; a white posteriorly dilated dark-edged streak along costa from near base to 2/5; four costal and three dorsal shining white anteriorly dark-margined triangular spots, first dorsal short, a blackish apical dot. Hindwings are grey.

There are two generations per year with adults on wing in May and again in August

The larvae feed on Salix repens. They mine the leaves of their host plant. They create a lower-surface tentiform mine, that may occupy the entire underside of a small leaf. The mine contracts strongly, folding the leaf and sometimes causing it to become tube-like. The lower epidermis has many fine folds. The pupa is made in a corner of the mine, while the frass is deposited in the opposite corner.

References

quinqueguttella
Moths of Europe
Moths described in 1851